The 2005 Western Australian state election was held on 26 February 2005.

Retiring Members

Labor
 Clive Brown MLA (Bassendean)
 John Cowdell MLC (South West)
 Kevin Leahy MLC (Mining and Pastoral)

Liberal
 Mike Board MLA (Murdoch)
 John Bradshaw MLA (Murray)
 Cheryl Edwardes MLA (Kingsley)
 Arthur Marshall MLA (Dawesville)
 Bill McNee MLA (Moore)
 Rod Sweetman MLA (Ningaloo)
 Peter Foss MLC (East Metropolitan)
 Bill Stretch MLC (South West)
 Derrick Tomlinson MLC (East Metropolitan)

National
 Ross Ainsworth MLA (Roe)
 Monty House MLA (Stirling)

Greens
 Chrissy Sharp MLC (South West)

Independent
 Larry Graham MLA (Pilbara)
 Phillip Pendal MLA (South Perth)
 Alan Cadby MLC (North Metropolitan) – elected as Liberal

Legislative Assembly

Sitting members are shown in bold text. Successful candidates are highlighted in the relevant colour. Where there is possible confusion, an asterisk (*) is also used.

Legislative Council
Sitting members are shown in bold text. Tickets that elected at least one MLC are highlighted in the relevant colour. Successful candidates are identified by an asterisk (*).

Agricultural
Five seats were up for election. The Labor Party was defending one seat. The Liberal Party was defending one seat. The National Party was defending one seat. The Greens were defending one seat. One Nation was defending one seat.

East Metropolitan
Five seats were up for election. The Labor Party was defending three seats. The Liberal Party was defending two seats.

Mining and Pastoral
Five seats were up for election. The Labor Party was defending two seats. The Liberal Party was defending one seat. The Greens were defending one seat. One Nation was defending one seat.

North Metropolitan
Seven seats were up for election. The Labor Party was defending three seats. The Liberal Party was defending three seats. The Greens were defending one seat.

South Metropolitan
Five seats were up for election. The Labor Party was defending two seats. The Liberal Party was defending two seats. The Greens were defending one seat.

South West
Seven seats were up for election. The Labor Party was defending two seats. The Liberal Party was defending three seats. The Greens were defending one seat. One Nation was defending one seat.

See also
 Members of the Western Australian Legislative Assembly, 2001–2005
 Members of the Western Australian Legislative Assembly, 2005–2008
 Members of the Western Australian Legislative Council, 2001–2005
 Members of the Western Australian Legislative Council, 2005–2009
 2005 Western Australian state election

References
Voting by District - Psephos, Adam Carr's Election Archive
Legislative Council candidates - Western Australian Electoral Commission

Candidates for Western Australian state elections